Victor Vernicos Jørgensen (born 23 October 2006) is a Greek-Danish singer and songwriter. He is set to represent Greece in the Eurovision Song Contest 2023 with the song "What They Say".

Biography
Victor Vernicos was born in October 2006 in Athens to a Danish father and a Greek mother. He started piano lessons at the age of four, singing lessons at eight, and guitar lessons at ten. He started writing his own songs at the age of eleven, and has been producing his own music since 2021. In 2021, Vernicos first released a song that was written and produced entirely by himself.

In 2022, Vernicos announced that he had submitted a song to the Greek public broadcaster ERT to be considered as a possible entry for the Eurovision Song Contest 2023. On 28 December 2022, it was revealed that his entry "What They Say" was among the seven shortlisted acts. He subsequently advanced to the final three candidates. On 30 January 2023, it was announced by ERT that Vernicos had been selected to represent Greece in the Eurovision Song Contest 2023. He is set to be the youngest artist to have represented Greece in the Eurovision Song Contest.

Discography

Singles 
 2020 – "Apart"
 2021 – "Fake Club"
 2021 – "Hope It's in Heaven"
 2022 – "Youthful Eyes"
 2022 – "Mean To"
 2022 – "Out of This World"
 2022 – "Brutally Honest with You"
 2023 – "What They Say"

References 

2006 births
Living people
21st-century Greek male singers
English-language singers from Greece
Eurovision Song Contest entrants for Greece
Eurovision Song Contest entrants of 2023
Greek pop singers
Greek people of Danish descent
Greek singer-songwriters
Singers from Athens
Panik Records artists